Iván Bolado Palacios (born 3 July 1989) is an Equatoguinean retired footballer who played as a striker.

Club career
Born in Santander, Cantabria, Bolado made his professional debut with hometown club Racing de Santander's first team in 2007–08 and scored three league goals during the season, one of them in the dying minutes of the final matchday as the team defeated CA Osasuna 1–0 at home to secure a first-ever qualification to the UEFA Cup. His La Liga debut came on 26 August 2007, in a 0–0 home draw against FC Barcelona.

In August 2008, Bolado was loaned for a season to second division club Elche CF, with a clause which permitted his return to Racing in the January transfer window if requested. He returned to the Cantabrians in June 2009, going on to spend the vast majority of the 2009–10 campaign in the sidelines, with a severe knee injury he sustained in pre-season.

In one of his first games upon his return to action, Bolado netted twice – once through a bicycle kick – but Racing lost 3–4 at Athletic Bilbao on 29 March 2010. In 2010–11, barred by the likes of Ariel Nahuelpan and Markus Rosenberg (and Giovani dos Santos from January 2011 onwards), he could only appear in 19 games (seven starts, 728 minutes of action, one goal, again against the Basques and in another away defeat (1–2)).

In February 2012, after starting off with FC Cartagena in the second level, Bolado moved to Bulgaria and signed with PFC CSKA Sofia. In only his first match, a 0–2 away defeat against PSFC Chernomorets Burgas, he tore the ligaments in his knee and missed the rest of the season.

Bolado had fully recovered from his injury by mid-September 2012. In March 2014 he returned to his country of birth, joining Real Avilés from Segunda División B.

In the summer of 2014, Bolado joined FC Pune City in the newly formed Indian Super League.

International career
Born to a mixed-race Equatoguinean father of Cantabrian and Fang descent, Bolado was called by the Equatorial Guinea team for the 2012 Africa Cup of Nations tournament. He made his debut on 6 January 2012, in a friendly with South Africa.

Club statistics

Honours
Spain U20
Mediterranean Games: 2009

References

External links

1989 births
Living people
Spanish sportspeople of Equatoguinean descent
Citizens of Equatorial Guinea through descent
Equatoguinean sportspeople of Spanish descent
Footballers from Santander, Spain
Spanish footballers
Equatoguinean footballers
Association football forwards
La Liga players
Segunda División players
Segunda División B players
Tercera División players
Rayo Cantabria players
Racing de Santander players
Elche CF players
FC Cartagena footballers
Real Avilés CF footballers
Deportivo Rayo Cantabria players
First Professional Football League (Bulgaria) players
PFC CSKA Sofia players
Indian Super League players
FC Pune City players
Spain youth international footballers
Spain under-21 international footballers
Equatorial Guinea international footballers
2012 Africa Cup of Nations players
2015 Africa Cup of Nations players
Competitors at the 2009 Mediterranean Games
Mediterranean Games medalists in football
Mediterranean Games gold medalists for Spain
Spanish expatriate footballers
Equatoguinean expatriate footballers
Expatriate footballers in Bulgaria
Expatriate footballers in India
Spanish expatriate sportspeople in Bulgaria
Spanish expatriate sportspeople in India
Equatoguinean expatriate sportspeople in Bulgaria
Equatoguinean expatriate sportspeople in India